Sergent Garcia is the band formed around French singer Bruno Garcia (1964, France) who had previously been the guitarist of punk band Ludwig Von 88.

Sergent Garcia’s music is a mixture of cumbia, reggae, salsa, ragamuffin, rock and other trends in a new style which he defines as salsamuffin.

He published in 2011 his sixth studio album, Una y otra vez (Cumbancha/The Gwagwita), recorded between France, Spain, Cuba and Colombia.

Discography
Viva el Sergento (1997)
Un poquito quema'o (1999)
Sin Fronteras (2001)
La Semilla Escondida (2003)
Best Of (compilation) (2004)
Mascaras (2006)
Cumbiamuffin (EP) (2009)
Una y Otra Vez (2011)
 Anthologie (2006-2010)
Contre Vents Et Marées (2015)

External links
Allmusic profile
Los Angeles Times article
Chicago Sun-Times article
U-T San Diego article
The Guardian article

1964 births
Dancehall musicians
Living people
French multi-instrumentalists
French people of Spanish descent
Spanish-language singers of France